Chasmosaurus is a genus of ceratopsid dinosaur from the Upper Cretaceous Period of North America. Its name means 'opening lizard', referring to the large openings (fenestrae) in its frill (Greek chasma meaning 'opening' or 'hollow' or 'gulf' and sauros meaning 'lizard'). Like all ceratopsians, it was purely herbivorous. It was initially to be called Protorosaurus, but this name had been previously published for another animal. All specimens of Chasmosaurus were collected from the Dinosaur Park Formation of the Dinosaur Provincial Park of Alberta, Canada. Referred specimens of C. russelli come from the lower beds of the formation while C. belli comes from middle and upper beds.

Discovery and species
 
In 1898, at Berry Creek, Alberta, Lawrence Morris Lambe of the Geological Survey of Canada made the first discovery of Chasmosaurus remains; holotype NMC 491, a parietal bone that was part of a neck frill. Although recognizing that his find represented a new species, Lambe thought this could be placed in a previously-known short-frilled ceratopsian genus: Monoclonius. He erected the new species Monoclonius belli to describe his findings. The specific name honoured collector Walter Bell.

However, in 1913, Charles Hazelius Sternberg and his sons found several complete "M. belli" skulls in the middle Dinosaur Park Formation of Alberta, Canada. Based on these finds, Lambe (1914) erected Protorosaurus ("before Torosaurus"), but that name was preoccupied by the Permian reptile Protorosaurus, so he subsequently created the replacement name Chasmosaurus in February 1914. The name Chasmosaurus is derived from Greek χάσμα, khasma, "opening" or "divide" and refers to the very large parietal fenestrae in the skull frill. Lambe now also assigned a paratype, specimen NMC 2245 found by the Sternbergs in 1913 and consisting of a largely complete skeleton, including skin impressions.

Since that date, more remains, including skulls, have been found that have been referred to Chasmosaurus, and several additional species have been named within the genus. Today some of these are considered to only reflect a morphological variation among the known sample of Chasmosaurus belli skulls; others are seen as valid species of Chasmosaurus or as separate genera. In 1933 Barnum Brown named Chasmosaurus kaiseni, honouring Peter Kaisen and based on skull AMNH 5401, differing from C. belli in having very long brow horns. This form is perhaps related to Chasmosaurus canadensis ('from Canada') named by Thomas M. Lehman in 1990. The latter species, originally Monoclonius canadensis Lambe 1902, had been described as Eoceratops canadensis by Lambe in 1915. Eoceratops and the long-horned Chasmosaurus kaiseni were thought to probably be exemplars of Mojoceratops by Nicholas Longrich, although different teams of researchers have found Mojoceratops to be a synonym of Chasmosaurus russelli. Campbell and colleagues, in their 2016 analysis of Chasmosaurus specimens found Eoceratops and C. kaiseni to be referable to Chasmosaurus sp. due to the lack of the parietal preserved in the holotypes of both. Richard Swann Lull in 1933 named an unusual, short-muzzled skull, specimen ROM 839 (earlier ROM 5436) collected in 1926, as Chasmosaurus brevirostris, "with a short snout". This has been seen as a junior synonym of C. belli. 

Charles Mortram Sternberg added Chasmosaurus russelli in 1940, based on specimen NMC 8800 from southwestern Alberta (lower Dinosaur Park Formation). The specific name honours Loris Shano Russell. In 1987, Gregory S. Paul renamed Pentaceratops sternbergii into Chasmosaurus sternbergi, but this has found no acceptance. In 2000, George Olshevsky renamed Monoclonius recurvicornis Cope 1889 into Chasmosaurus recurvicornis as its fossil material is likely chasmosaurine; this is a nomen dubium. Thomas Lehman described Chasmosaurus mariscalensis in 1989 from Texas, which has now been renamed Agujaceratops. 

The most recently described species is Chasmosaurus irvinensis named in 2001, which stems from the uppermost beds of the Dinosaur Park Formation. This species was given its own genus, Vagaceratops, in 2010. However, Campbell et al. (2019) referred Vagaceratops back to Chasmosaurus.  As Fowler and Fowler found Vagaceratops likely to be the sister taxon of Kosmoceratops in 2020, they suggested it should be maintained as a distinct genus from Chasmosaurus, as its placement would probably remain unstable until chasmosaurines are better understood.

The species Mojoceratops perifania was based on holotype specimen TMP 1983.25.1 consisting of a partial skull including the parietal and from the paratypes TMP 1999.55.292, an isolated lateral ramus of a right parietal, and NMC 8803, central bar and lateral rami of parietals. Specimens AMNH 5656, NMC 34832 and TMP 1979.11.147, and (tentatively) AMNH 5401 and NMC 1254 were also referred to the genus. All specimens assigned to Mojoceratops were collected from the Dinosaur Park Formation (late Campanian, 76.5–75 ma) of the Belly River Group of Alberta and Saskatchewan, western Canada. Mojoceratops was named by Nicholas R. Longrich in 2010 and the type species is Mojoceratops perifania. The generic name is derived from mojo and the specific name means "conspicuous pride" in Greek, both referring to the skull frill. The species is based on fossils thought by other researchers to belong to Chasmosaurus.

The species Chasmosaurus kaiseni, known from specimen AMNH 5401, a nearly complete (but partially restored) skull on display at the American Museum of Natural History, was considered to share features in common with Mojoceratops perifania and therefore was considered a possible synonym. However, the parietal (back margin of the frill) is not preserved, and was restored with plaster based on specimens of Chasmosaurus, which caused confusion among scientists in previous decades, because the parietal bone is critical for determining differences between species in ceratopsids like Chasmosaurus and Mojoceratops. Chasmosaurus kaiseni was then by Longrich regarded as a nomen dubium, rather than as the senior synonym of M. perifania. Longrich also regarded the holotype of Eoceratops as probably being an exemplar of Mojoceratops. He considered it too poorly preserved for a reliable determination, especially as it belonged to a juvenile individual, and regarded it too as a nomen dubium, rather than as the senior synonym of M. perifania. A 2016 overview of Chasmosaurus found C. kaiseni and Eoceratops to be referable to Chasmosaurus sp. due to the lack of the parietal preserved in the holotypes of both.

Following the original assignment of the holotype and other skulls to Mojoceratops, several teams of researchers published work questioning the validity of this new genus. In 2011, Maidment & Barrett failed to confirm the presence of any supposedly unique features, and argued that Mojoceratops perifania was a synonym of Chasmosaurus russelli. Campbell and colleagues, in their 2016 analysis of Chasmosaurus specimens, agreed with the conclusions of Maidment & Barrett, adding that some supposedly unique features, such as grooves on the parietal bone, were actually also present in the holotype of C. russelli and, to various degrees, in other Chasmosaurus specimens. This variability, they argued, strongly suggested that Mojoceratops was simply a mature growth stage of C. russelli. Recently, the referral of Eoceratops, C. kaiseni, and Mojoceratops to C. russelli was considered doubtful as the holotype of C. russelli is actually from the upper Dinosaur Park Formation, according to recent fieldwork. This situation is further complicated since C. russelli may not even belong to the genus Chasmosaurus, sharing features with the contemporaneous derived chasmosaurine Utahceratops.

Today, taxonomy of Chasmosaurus is in a state of flux. For the aforementioned reasons, it is likely that Mojoceratops, Eoceratops, and C. kaiseni belong to a distinct species, if not genus, of chasmosaurine. Specimens referred to C. russelli are all from the lower Dinosaur Park Formation, stratigraphically and morphologically separate from C. belli. Apart from the holotype and paratype several additional specimens of C. belli are known. These include AMNH 5422, ROM 843 (earlier ROM 5499) and NHMUK R4948, all (partial) skeletons with skull. The skull YPM 2016 and the skull and skeleton AMNH 5402 were noted by Campbell et al. (2016) as differing from other C. belli referred specimens in having more epiparietals, although the authors interpreted them as individual variation, but this was reconsidered when Campbell et al. (2019) interpreted these specimens as an indeterminate Chasmosaurus species closely related to Vagaceratops. The specimen CMN 2245 was referred to the Vagaceratops-like Chasmosaurus species by Fowler and Freedman Fowler (2020), who noted that "given the similarity between these two specimens (YPM 2016 and AMNH 5402) and CMN 2245, it is not clear why CMN 2245 was left in C. belli."

In 2015, Nicholas Longrich presented a novel theory that posits C. belli and C. russelli are synonymous, while splitting some remains assigned to the latter to a new species, C. priscus. Because the publication was rejected, C. "priscus" remains a nomen nudum; however, the name appeared in the pre-proof of the description of Sierraceratops before being edited out for final publication.

Description

Chasmosaurus was a medium-size ceratopsid. In 2010 G.S. Paul estimated the length of C. belli at 4.8 metres, its weight at two tonnes; the lower Dinosaur Park Formation species would have been 4.3 metres long and weighed 1.5 tonnes. 
 
The known differences between the two species mainly pertain to the horn and frill shape, as the referred postcrania of C. russelli are poorly known. Like many ceratopsians, Chasmosaurus had three main facial horns - one on the nose and two on the brow. In both species these horns are quite short, but with the lower Dinosaur Park species they are somewhat longer, especially the brow horns, and more curved backwards. The frill of Chasmosaurus is very elongated and broader at the rear than at the front. It is hardly elevated from the plane of the snout. With C. belli the rear of the frill is V-shaped and its sides are straight. With the lower DPF species the rear edge is shaped as a shallow U, and the sides are more convex. The sides were adorned by six to nine smaller skin ossifications (called episquamosals) or osteoderms, which attached to the squamosal bone. The corner of the frill featured two larger osteoderms on the parietal bone. With the lower DPF species the outer one was the largest, with C. belli the inner one. The remainder of the rear edge lacked osteoderms. The parietal bones of the frill were pierced by very large openings, after which the genus was named: the parietal fenestrae. These were not oval in shape, as with most relatives, but triangular, with one point orientated towards the frill corner.

The postcranium of C. belli is best preserved in the specimen known as NHMUK 4948. The first three cervical vertebrae are fused into a unit known as a syncervical, as in other neoceratopsians. There are five other cervicals preserved in this specimen, for a total of eight, which likely represents a complete neck. The dorsal vertebrae are also amphiplatian.

The Chasmosaurus specimen NMC 2245 recovered by C.M. Sternberg was accompanied by skin impressions. The area conserved, from the right hip region, measured about one by 0.5 metres. The skin appears to have had large scales in evenly spaced horizontal rows among smaller scales. The larger scales had a diameter of up to fifty-five millimetres and were distanced from each other by five to ten centimetres. They were hexagonal or pentagonal, thus with five or six sides. Each of these sides touched somewhat smaller scales, forming a rosette. Small, non-overlapping convex scales of about one centimetre in diameter surrounded the whole. The larger scales were wrinkled due to straight grooves orientated perpendicular to their edges. From top to bottom, the large scale rows gradually declined in size. Unfortunately, nothing can as yet be learned about the coloration of Chasmosaurus from the known fossil skin impression samples.

Classification

Chasmosaurus was in 1915 by Lambe within the Ceratopsia assigned to the Chasmosaurinae. The Chasmosaurinae usually have long frills, like Chasmosaurus itself, whereas their sister-group the Centrosaurinae typically have shorter frills. Most cladistic analyses show that Chasmosaurus has a basal position in the Chasmosaurinae.
  
The following cladogram shows the phylogeny of Chasmosaurus according to a study by Scott Sampson e.a. in 2010.

Paleobiology

Chasmosaurus shared its habitat, the east coast of Laramidia, with successive species of Centrosaurus. A certain niche partitioning is suggested by the fact that Chasmosaurus had a longer snout and jaws and might have been more selective about the plants it ate.

The function of the frill and horns is problematic. The horns are rather short and the frill had such large fenestrae that it could not have offered much functional defense. Paul suggested that the beak was the main defensive weapon. It is possible that the frill was simply used to appear imposing or conceivably for thermoregulation. The frill may also have been brightly colored, to draw attention to its size or as part of a mating display. However, it is difficult to prove any sexual dimorphism. In 1933, Lull suggested that C. kaiseni, which bore long brow horns, was in fact the male of C. belli of which the females would have short ones. In 1927 C.M. Sternberg concluded that of the two skeletons he had mounted in the Canadian Museum of Nature, the smaller one, NMC 2245, was the male and the larger, NMC 2280, the female. However, today the two are referred to different species.

A juvenile Chasmosaurus belli found in Alberta, Canada by Phil Currie et al., reveals that Chasmosaurus may have cared for its young, like its relative, Triceratops, is hypothesized to have done. The juvenile measured five feet long and was estimated to be three years of age and had similar limb proportions to the adult Chasmosaurus. This indicates that Chasmosaurus was not fast moving, and that juveniles did not need to be fast moving either to keep pace with adults. The fossil was complete save for its missing front limbs, which had fallen into a sinkhole before the specimen was uncovered. Skin impressions were also uncovered beneath the skeleton and evidence from the matrix that it was buried in indicated that the juvenile ceratopsian drowned during a possible river crossing. Further study of the specimen revealed that juvenile chasmosaurs had a frill that was narrower in the back than that of adults, as well as being proportionately shorter in relation to the skull.

See also

 Timeline of ceratopsian research

References

Chasmosaurines
Late Cretaceous dinosaurs of North America
Fossil taxa described in 1914
Taxa named by Lawrence Lambe
Dinosaur Park fauna
Campanian genus first appearances
Campanian genus extinctions
Ornithischian genera
Campanian life